Élodie Bertrand (born 9 January 1981) is a French sailor who competed in the 2012 Summer Olympics in the Elliott 6m class with Claire Leroy and Marie Riou coming 6th overall.  The same team had won the bronze medal at the 2011 World Championships.

References

External links
 
 
 
 

1981 births
Living people
French female sailors (sport)
Olympic sailors of France
Sailors at the 2012 Summer Olympics – Elliott 6m
21st-century French women